Oie Lake/Dougall Campbell Field Aerodrome  is located adjacent to Oie Lake, British Columbia, Canada.

References

Registered aerodromes in British Columbia
Cariboo Regional District